The Waller Creek Boys were an Austin, Texas folk music band formed in 1962.  The band lineup was made up of; Janis Joplin: autoharp, Lanny Wiggins: guitar and vocals, and Powell St. John: vocals and harmonica.

References

External links
Powell St. John

American folk musical groups
Musical groups from Austin, Texas
Musical groups established in 1962
1962 establishments in Texas